Marcos Antonio Moreno, M.D. is a physician, public health advocate and medical research scholar. He is of Mexican and Native American descent, and an enrolled member of the Pascua Yaqui Tribe from the Pascua Yaqui Reservation in southern Arizona. He is a graduate of Cornell University, where he studied Neuroscience, and American Indian Studies. He is the first person from the Pascua Yaqui Reservation to graduate from an Ivy League University, and thus far is the only Doctor of Medicine from the Yaqui's reservation community. He received his Doctor of Medicine degree from UND-School of Medicine and Health Sciences, and is a resident physician at Yale University in the Department of Psychiatry.

Medical Research 
While at Cornell, Moreno contributed to work in a cognitive development laboratory studying the relationship of socioeconomic status and the conceptualization of resource scarcity, as well as the Ophir Brain and Behavior laboratory studying changes in mammalian neuroanatomy in response to environmental stressors. In addition to research at Cornell University, Moreno spent time as a researcher in the University of Arizona's neuropharmacology laboratory studying Neurokinin Receptor -1 (NK₁R) antagonists and Substance-P (SP) implications in neurological addiction reward pathways.

During medical school, Moreno worked as an addiction researcher with Dr. Larry Burd, one of the fields most preeminent experts of Fetal Alcohol Syndrome, and director of the Fetal Alcohol Syndrome Center. With this same mentor, Moreno would go on to publish research on the prevalence and management of intoxicated women during labor and delivery, in addition to outlining nine guidelines on fetal and maternal mortality/ morbidity for clinician consideration.

Moreno is also a noteworthy contributor to research on the neurologic ailment known as Posterior Reversible Encephalopathy Syndrome, or PRES, a rare, poorly understood disease with a number of associated factors but no clearly delineated etiology. During the Covid-19 pandemic, Moreno and a team of clinicians, encountered a patient who contracted SARS-CoV-2 and was treated with tocilizumab, an immunologic agent, and then later went on to develop PRES. Numerous case reports on this same occurrence have since been documented, however Moreno and his coworkers were one of the earlier known to document this specific clinical association.

Public Health 
Moreno served as a founding member of a chapter of the Global Medical Brigades in partnership with St. John's University beginning in 2013. The following year Moreno and this founding group began taking overseas mission trips to Ghana in west Africa to administer medical care, public health education and health implementation strategies to medically underserved villages. This was followed by subsequent trips to Latin America with the same mission. The Global Medical Brigades represents the largest student run organization in the world with chapter presence in Ghana, Guatemala, Honduras, Panama and Greece.

Aside from work overseas, Moreno has also assisted the Pascua Yaqui Tribe with planning, data acquisition, and report drafting for the tribe's first Community Health Needs Assessment beginning in 2014. This inaugural project marked the beginning stages of Moreno's efforts to assist the Pascua Yaqui Tribe's goal of attaining national accreditation status by the United States Public Health Accreditation Board, a feat which the tribe achieved in 2019. To this day the Pascua Yaqui Tribe is one of only 6 tribally accredited health facilities in the United States and the only accredited tribal facility in the Four Corners Region. The benefits of national accreditation status has allowed the Pascua Yaqui Tribe to continually track progress of the tribe's health and social programs, improve care access, and standards of living on the tribe's reservation.

Covid-19 Pandemic Efforts 
As was the case with many Indigenous communities, the Covid-19 pandemic heavily effected Moreno's reservation community in the early stages of the pandemic; as result he was a notable contributor to tribal vaccination efforts and appeared in several media campaigns by the Pascua Yaqui Tribe imploring his fellow tribal members to receive Covid-19 vaccination as soon as they were eligible. Despite initial skepticism from the Yaqui community, it appears Moreno and the tribe's vocal outreach through the Pascua Yaqui Tribe's Covid-19 Task Force ultimately paid off, as the community went on to achieve impressive rates of successful vaccination compared to other ethnic groups in America. It was in fact so successful, that Moreno and a team colleagues received national recognition for an article they published in the New England Journal of Medicine, where they discussed examples of community level interventions, many of which were implemented in Moreno's own community, that led to Native American's achieving the highest rates of Covid-19 vaccination in the United States.

Environmental Health Policy 
In 2022, Moreno contributed to a publication in The Lancet led by his former Udall scholar colleague Victor Lopez-Carmen, documenting case reviews and evidence of what he and the team termed "environmental violence" against Yaqui communities in the Rio Yaqui Valley of Sonora, Mexico. The publication compiled data and reported numerous examples of ailing health, fetal birth/ developmental anomalies, cognitive delays, all in conjunction with evidence of elevated blood pesticide levels in this same populace. This publication was notably critical of United States Federal Insecticide, Fungicide, and Rodenticide Act (FIFRA) statute, which allows “pesticides that are not approved – or registered – for use in the U.S.” to be manufactured in the U.S. and exported elsewhere, as is the case for many of the pesticides used in the Rio Yaqui Valley.

Native American Community Health 
Moreno has written at length regarding the challenges faced by Native American communities, with one of his major pieces being a chapter titled America’s Forgotten Minority in the book Global Indigenous Youth: Through Their Eyes. Published in 2019, the book represents a collaborative project by the United Nations and Columbia University's Institute of Human Rights, with aims to resolve the lack of information and knowledge about Indigenous Peoples from the first-hand perspective of youth from all seven United Nations regions; Africa; Asia; Europe; Latin America and the Caribbean, Oceania and North America. "The book presents Indigenous youth realities, challenges, struggles and visions for the respect of their rights, eloquently depicted in this volume-the voices of a continuing and renewed international Indigenous Peoples movement." Within this book, Moreno was one of two authors selected to represent the North American region, and the only author from the United States. Moreno attended the official book launch at the United Nations Headquarters in New York City, where he spoke at the books press conference about his chapter, and the continued need for further development of US Indian country/ Native American communities. Moreno would go on to further discuss the changing landscape of Native American communities and their healthcare needs in a separate book chapter titled Bridging the Gap, in the book American Indian Health Disparities in the 21st Century, published in 2021.

Awards 
In the Spring of 2016, Moreno was selected as a recipient of the nationally competitive Morris K. Udall award, a recognition for undergraduate scholars in the United States, for their work in the fields of Environmental Activism, Public Policy, or Healthcare which among other benefits, comes with a monetary value of $7,000.

Fall 2016, the Cornell Daily Sun reported that Moreno was inducted as a member of the 125th tapping class of Quill and Dagger, one of the oldest honor societies in the Ivy League. Membership of this once secretive society is now publicly available, with the names of all newly tapped Quill and Dagger members published in Cornell's newspaper, in addition to a book of enrollment available on Amazon. Little is known about the organizations current day privileges or practices, though they are rumored to exert significant influence over the Cornell community and U.S. Government.

In 2017 Moreno received the Henry Ricciuti Award from Cornell University, recognizing his outstanding "distinction in research, excellence in leadership, and to exceptional community and public service". Additionally in 2017, he was awarded the Solomon Cook Award for Engaged Research and Scholarship, an honor awarded to one Cornell undergraduate per year.

As result of Moreno's demonstrated commitment and work history in underserved communities, he was named a National Health Service Corp Medical Scholar by the United States Department of Health & Human Services in 2017.

References

1994 births
Living people
21st-century Native Americans
American health activists
American medical researchers
American neuroscientists
American people of Yaqui descent
Cornell University alumni
Native American scientists
Pascua Yaqui people